Carl Joseph Yvon Ouellet (born December 30, 1967) is a Canadian professional wrestler, better known by his ring name, PCO (originally a contraction of his long-term former ring name Pierre Carl Ouellet, but now standing for Perfect Creation One). He is currently signed to Impact Wrestling, where he is a former member of the Honor No More stable.

Ouellet is best known for his appearances with the World Wrestling Federation and World Championship Wrestling as one-half of The Quebecers/The Amazing French Canadians with Jacques Rougeau (with whom he held the WWF Tag Team Championship on three occasions). After retiring in 2011, Ouellet returned to the ring in 2016, undergoing a career renaissance with the gimmick of "part beast-turned-man, part old-time strongman". From 2018 to 2021, Ouellet wrestled for Ring of Honor (ROH), where he was a ROH World Champion, ROH World Tag Team Champion, and ROH World Six-Man Tag Team Champion. Other promotions Ouellet has wrestled for include Extreme Championship Wrestling, the International Wrestling Association, and Major League Wrestling.

Professional wrestling career

Early career (1987–1993)
Carl Ouellet debuted in 1987. He worked on the independent circuit - at one point forming a tag team with "Evil" Eddie Watts known as "The Super Bees".

He also worked in South Africa and Germany.

In January 1993, Ouellet began wrestling for the International Wrestling Association in Puerto Rico. While working in Puerto Rico, he was offered a tryout with the World Wrestling Federation.

World Wrestling Federation (1993–1995)

The Quebecers (1993–1994)

In 1993, Ouellet joined the World Wrestling Federation as the tag team partner of Jacques Rougeau. As one half of The Quebecers, Ouellet adopted the name "Pierre" and dressed like Mounties. This was a reference to Jacques's previous gimmick, The Mountie, which had been banned in Canada due to concern that the heelish character of The Mountie would lead to children mistrusting legitimate Mounties. The Quebecers sang their own entrance theme, in which they stated that, contrary to appearances, "We're not the Mounties". Later in the year they were joined by manager, Johnny Polo.

The Quebecers held the WWF Tag Team Championship on three occasions. On September 13, 1993, they defeated the Steiner Brothers for the tag titles (under "Province of Quebec Rules", which provided for titles changing hands on disqualifications). They were defeated by the 1-2-3 Kid and Marty Jannetty on January 10, 1994, and again by Men on a Mission on March 29 (during a tour of England) but each time regained the titles within days. They lost the belts a third and final time to The Headshrinkers on the May 2 episode of Monday Night Raw in Burlington, Vermont. After losing to The Headshrinkers at a house show in July, that led to Pierre's sneak attack on Jacques. The feud culminated in the former partners' wrestling one another in Rougeau's retirement match on October 21, 1994, in Montreal, main-eventing a sold-out house show. After Jacques retired, Ouellet worked in house shows.

Jean-Pierre LaFitte (1995)

In March 1995, Ouellet was repackaged as "Jean-Pierre LaFitte", the supposed descendant of the pirate Jean LaFitte. As a pirate he wore an eyepatch over his blind right eye. He engaged in a three-month feud with Bret Hart and stole the mirrored sunglasses that Hart handed to fans at ringside. After LaFitte stole Hart's trademark leather jacket, the enemies faced one another at In Your House 3 on September 24, 1995, where Hart forced Ouellet to submit by using the Sharpshooter. In his Wrestling Observer Newsletter, Dave Meltzer described this pay-per-view match as the "show saver" and an "excellent match." Hart later recalled, "In a lot of ways, I loved working with guys like him. He was a guy, that when he threw you in the ropes, he really threw you in the rope...everything he did was power, and at the same time he was a very safe guy.... He took a lot of pride in his work, he really wanted to have a great match with me...And so we worked really hard, and it was a really good match."

Ouellet's WWF career came to an end after an alleged legit conflict with The Kliq, a backstage group including main-event wrestlers Shawn Michaels and Diesel. According to Shane Douglas, who was working with the company at that time, a match pitting LaFitte against Nash, then the WWF Champion, in a house show in LaFitte's hometown Montreal was booked to end without a clean finish, with Lafitte winning by either DQ or countout, enabling the WWF to return to Montreal for a rematch at a later time. However, due to backstage politicking by Shawn Michaels the booking was reversed into a clean pinfall for Diesel. In turn, LaFitte refused to be pinned by Diesel and the match ended in a double-countout. Due to his refusal to put Diesel over, LaFitte was buried due to the Kliq's influence. Ouellet left the WWF in November 1995.

World Championship Wrestling (1996–1997) 

In September 1996, Ouellet reunited with Jacques Rougeau and moved to World Championship Wrestling (WCW), where the duo was known as The Amazing French Canadians. They wore more traditional wrestling gear, but failed to duplicate the success they had found in the WWF. They had the distinction of losing to Arn Anderson and Steve "Mongo" McMichael in Anderson's last match.

The Amazing French Canadians were managed by Col. Robert Parker (who began dressing in a French Foreign Legion uniform), and they began feuding with Harlem Heat as a result of tension between Parker and Harlem Heat's manager, Sister Sherri. After Harlem Heat defeated the Amazing French Canadians at World War 3 on November 24, 1996, Sherri won the right to fight Parker for three minutes. Parker was beaten down by Sherri, but the rivals later reconciled and fell in love with one another.

In April 1997, Ouellet won a 'patch match' against The Giant in a house show in Montreal via disqualification. He made his final appearance with WCW on the June 16, 1997, episode of Nitro, with he and Jacques losing to Harlem Heat.

Catch Wrestling Association (1997) 
From September to December 1997, Ouellet wrestled for the Catch Wrestling Association in Hanover and Bremen in Germany. Wrestling as "Jean-Pierre LaFitte", he competed in both the Catch Cup and the International Catch Cup.

Return to WWF (1998–2000)

Along with Jacques, Ouellet was rehired by the WWF in January 1998. Ouellet competed in the Brawl for All tournament, but lost in the first round to "Dr. Death" Steve Williams. The Quebecers took part in the tag team battle royal at WrestleMania XIV, but disbanded once again soon afterward. Along with other WWF employees such as Bart Gunn and Vader, he worked for All Japan Pro Wrestling as part of a talent loan, and spent time in the WWF's Memphis based developmental territory, Power Pro Wrestling, where he was known as "Kris Kannonball". He left the WWF once more when his contract expired in January 2000, unhappy with the way he was being used.

Extreme Championship Wrestling (2000)
Ouellet began working for Extreme Championship Wrestling in mid-2000, squashing jobbers for several weeks before losing to Justin Credible in a match for Credible's ECW World Heavyweight Championship.

Return to WCW (2000)

Ouellet and Rougeau had a second run in WCW in August 2000, briefly joining Team Canada at the New Blood Rising pay-per-view. Rougeau—who had additionally served as a guest referee in Lance Storm's win over Mike Awesome—left immediately afterwards, upset with the WCW creative team's plans for him, while Ouellet worked two more dates in Canada and was awarded the WCW Hardcore Championship by Storm on August 14 as Storm held three different titles at the same time. He lost the title that same night to Norman Smiley.

Due to working visa issues, Ouellet could not work in the US, and had to be released back to Canada soon after.

Independent circuit (2000–2005)
Between 2000 and 2003, Ouellet appeared with Rougeau's International Wrestling 2000 promotion. He headlined an event in the Verdun Auditorium in Montreal on December 29, 2000, facing King Kong Bundy in front of an audience of 4,000. In the summer of 2003 Ouellet decided to begin wrestling in the Quebec area once more.

Ouellet returned to the Puerto Rican promotion International Wrestling Association, this time wrestling as Jean-Pierre Laffite. He was brought in by Savio Vega to join his stable, The corporation. Immediately he feuded with then-IWA Intercontinental Champion Ricky Banderas, a feud that lasted around 3 months. He was managed by José Chaparro, another member of Vega's Corporation. At Summer Attitude, after a losing effort to Ricky Banderas. In April 2005 defeated Banderas to win IWA Intercontinental Heavyweight Championship for first time in his career. Lafitte left IWA.

NWA Total Nonstop Action / Total Nonstop Action Wrestling (2003, 2005–2007)
In November 2003, Ouellet debuted in NWA Total Nonstop Action as "X", a masked wrestler who competed primarily in the X Division as he had a feud with Christopher Daniels and Sonjay Dutt. He left after two months.

In February 2005, Ouellet began hosting the French version of TNA Impact! from the RDS studios with Marc Blondin, replacing Michel Letourneur. He even had a war of the words against comedian Jean-René Dufort (of Infoman fame), to which Dufort responded by adopting the wrestling gimmick "La Punaise Masquée" (The Masked Tick) and "challenging" Ouellet to a match. However, Dufort backed out before the match could take place. In October 2007 he quit the company and was replaced by Sylvain Grenier.

Independent circuit (2005–2011)
In the mid-2000s, Ouellet wrestled for the Montreal-based International Wrestling Syndicate and the Hull-based CPW International promotion, under the "Pierre Carl Ouellet" name once again. In October 2007, Ouellet wrestled a dark match for World Wrestling Entertainment under the name of "Carl Ouellet" at the ECW / SmackDown! tapings. He was defeated by Tommy Dreamer.

Ouellet also wrestled for All-Star promotions in Britain alongside his friends and tag team partners with Rene Dupree. Ouellet has mainly been working a lot of Tag Team matches with Rene Dupree, Robbie Dynamite, Hannibal and Mikey Whiplash. He defeated Sylvain Grenier in an RDS battle on June 21, 2008, in Hawkesbury, Ontario Canada with Marc Blondin serving as the special referee. In July 2008, Ouellet lost to Charlie Haas on Monday Night Raw in a dark match. In an interview with Slam! Sports on August 6, 2008, Ouellet declared that he would like another stint with the WWE. He then defeated long-time rival Kevin Nash on May 30, 2009, at the International Wrestling Syndicate's 10th Anniversary show by making him submit via an armbar. 

Ouellet retired from professional wrestling on February 8, 2011.

Return to the independent circuit (2016–2018) 

On May 21, 2016, Ouellet made his return to professional wrestling at an MWF event, entitled "Collision," in Valleyfield, Quebec, Canada, defeating Jake Matthews, following a cannonball. On November 5, 2017, Ouellet, as "Quebecer" Jean-Pierre Lafitte, defeated Hannibal to win the Great North Wrestling Canadian Championship in Rockland, ON. On May 25, 2018, Ouellet was defeated by Hannibal via disqualification in a Great North Wrestling Championship rematch in Pembroke, ON.  Post-match, Ouellet was stripped of the championship for his assault on GNW President, Michael Andrews. Under a new gimmick as a "French Frankenstein" as Ouellet described it, he became a regular name in several independent promotions. On April 2, 2018, Ouellet defeated Walter at Game Changer Wrestling's (GCW) Joey Janela's Spring Break 2 in New Orleans. Ouellet's performance and online footage of his unconventional workout regimen impressed the independent wrestling audience, and led to many higher-profile bookings.

On June 18, 2018, Ouellet was announced as the first of twenty-four participants for Pro Wrestling Guerrilla's (PWG) annual Battle of Los Angeles tournament. At 2018 Battle of Los Angeles - Stage One on September 15, he made his company debut, losing to Brody King in the Opening Round. Two nights later, at 2018 Battle of Los Angeles - Final Stage, he led a losers' ten-man tag team match, in which Team PCO (Ouellet, Darby Allin, Dan Barry, Jody Fleisch and Puma King) defeated Team DJ Z (DJ Z, Adam Brooks, David Starr, T-Hawk and Timothy Thatcher).

Ring of Honor (2018–2021)
On December 1, 2018, Ouellet announced his exclusive signing with Ring of Honor. He debuted for ROH at the December 15 tapings joining up with Marty Scurll and Brody King in a new stable called Villain Enterprises. At Honor Reigns Supreme 2019, Villain Enterprises defeated Silas Young and the Briscoe Brothers. PCO and King would then go on to win the 2019 ROH Tag Wars Tournament during the ROH Road To G1 Supercard tour in February 2019, and on March 15, 2019, he and King defeated the Briscoes to win the ROH World Tag Team Championship for the first time in a Las Vegas street fight at the ROH 17th Anniversary Show. The following night at the Ring of Honor Wrestling tapings, PCO, King and Scurll defeated The Kingdom to win the ROH World Six-Man Tag Team Championship, making PCO a double champion within a 24-hour span.

At the G1 Supercard, PCO and King dropped the ROH World Tag Team Championship to the Guerrillas of Destiny in a winner takes all four-way tag team match also including the Briscoe Brothers and Evil and Sanada, with G.O.D.'s IWGP Tag Team Championship belts also on the line. In a Six Man Tag title defence, PCO would get the winning fall over ROH World Champion Matt Taven, which gave him a future title opportunity.

On April 27 at the 2019 Crockett Cup event, PCO and King won the eight-team tournament (winning three matches in the same night) to not only win the Crockett Cup Trophy, but also win the vacant NWA World Tag Team Championship as well. At War of the Worlds, PCO challenged ROH World Champion Matt Taven for the championship, however he was defeated. The following night, PCO continued his feud with Taven by attacking Taven following his win over Mark Haskins. PCO would then compete in a Four Corner Survival match to determine the #1 contender for the ROH World Championship which was won by Jeff Cobb. At State of the Art, PCO competed in a DEFY or DENY match for the ROH World Championship which was won by Taven. At Death Before Dishonor XVII, PCO defeated Kenny King in a First-round match in the Final Battle ROH World Championship #1 contender tournament. At Glory By Honor XVII, PCO defeated fellow member of Villain Enterprises Marty Scurll in the finals of the tournament to become the #1 contender for the ROH World Championship. At Final Battle, PCO defeated Rush to become the ROH World Champion, in the process once again becoming a double champion in ROH, as well as becoming a world champion for the first time in his career. After his title win, Villain Enterpraises feuded with Rush's La Facción Ingobernable, retaining the World title against Dragon Lee, but losing against Rush on February 29. at Best in the World, PCO and Danhausen defeated The Bouncers (Brian Milonas and Beer City Bruiser).

Return to Impact Wrestling (2022–present) 
At Hard To Kill, on January 8, 2022, PCO made his return to TNA, now known as Impact Wrestling, appeared along with Matt Taven, Vincent, Mike Bennett, and Maria, attacking Eddie Edwards, Rich Swann, Willie Mack, Heath and Rhino. On January 13, it was revealed that PCO had signed a contract with Impact.on the January 27 episode of Impact Wrestling, PCO defeated Chris Sabin. At No Surrender, Honor No More (Matt Taven, PCO, Mike Bennett, Vincent, and Kenny King) defeated Team Impact (Chris Sabin, Rhino, Rich Swann, Steve Maclin, and Willie Mack) in a 10 man tag team match to remain in Impact. At Sacrifice, PCO lost to Jonah. At Multiverse of Matches, PCO and Moose lost to Josh Alexander and Jonah. On the April 14 episode of Impact Wrestling, PCO lost to Jonah. On April 24 PCO defeated Jonah in a Monsters Ball match in Poughkeepsie NY for a TV episode to be aired on May 5.

On October 20 episode of Impact Wrestling, PCO would turn face by leaving Honor No More attacking his partners after Eddie Edwards quoted, "PCO is nothing but a bitch!"

Lucha Libre AAA (2023)
PCO made his Mexico debut on March 19, 2023, for Lucha Libre AAA At the Lucha Libre World Cup in Guadalajara, MX

Personal life
Ouellet lost vision in his right eye at the age of 12 after an accident with a pellet gun.

Championships and accomplishments
 Black Label Pro
 BLP Heavyweight Championship (1 time)
 Catch Wrestling Association
 CWA World Tag Team Champion (1 time) – with Rhino Richards
 CPW International
 CPW Tag Team Championship (1 time) – with Dangerous Dan
 International Wrestling Association
 IWA Intercontinental Championship (1 time)
 Game Changer Wrestling
 GCW Extreme Championship (1 time)
 Great North Wrestling
 GNW Canadian Championship (1 time)
 International Wrestling Syndicate
 IWS World Heavyweight Championship (1 time)
 Tag Team Royal Rumble (2004) – with Sid Vicious
 Jonquiere Championship Wrestling
 JCW Heavyweight Championship (1 time)
 National Wrestling Alliance
 NWA World Tag Team Championship (1 time) – with Brody King
 Crockett Cup (2019) – with Brody King
 North Pro Wrestling
 NPW Heavyweight Championship (1 time)
 Pro Wrestling Illustrated
 Ranked No. 393 of the top 500 singles wrestlers of the "PWI Years" in 2003
 Ranked No. 31 of the top 500 singles wrestlers in the PWI 500 in 2020
 Ranked No. 83 of the top 100 tag teams of the PWI Years with Jacques Rougeau in 2003
 Ring of Honor
 ROH World Championship (1 time)
 ROH World Six-Man Tag Team Championship (1 time) – with Brody King and Marty Scurll 
 ROH World Tag Team Championship (1 time) – with Brody King
 Tag Wars (2019) – with Brody King
 ROH World Championship No.1 Contendership Tournament (2019)
 ROH Year-End Award (2 times)
 Holy S*** Moment of the Year (2019)
 Faction of the Year (2019) – 
 Top of the World Wrestling
 TOW Tag Team Championship (1 time) – with Al Snow
 World Championship Wrestling
 WCW Hardcore Championship (1 time)
 World Wrestling Federation
 WWF Tag Team Championship (3 times) – with Quebecer Jacques
 Xtreme Zone Wrestling
 XZW Ironman Championship (1 time)

References

External links 
 
 
 

1967 births
Canadian blind people
Canadian disabled sportspeople
Canadian male professional wrestlers
Fictional pirates
French Quebecers
Living people
People from Montérégie
Professional wrestlers from Quebec
Professional wrestling announcers
ROH World Champions
20th-century professional wrestlers
21st-century professional wrestlers
ROH World Tag Team Champions
ROH World Six-Man Tag Team Champions
NWA World Tag Team Champions
Villain Enterprises members